My Name Is Anthony Gonsalves is a 2008 Indian Hindi-language crime-drama film directed by Eeshwar Nivas and starring newcomer Nikhil Dwivedi, Amrita Rao and Mithun Chakraborty as the lead protagonists. The name of this film is derived from superstars Amitabh Bachchan, Vinod Khanna, and Rishi Kapoor's successful film Amar Akbar Anthony'''s famous song, "My Name Is Anthony Gonsalves." It was released on 11 January 2008 and was a box office bomb.

PlotMy Name Is Anthony Gonsalves starts with a gangster and killer, Sikander, murdering someone with his gang; they bury him and flee. Then the story line drops to a young man, Anthony Gonsalves (introducin, who accepts Sikander for his father, guru, everything, since Sikander adopted Anthony when he was a young child living on the streets. He didn't exactly adopt him, since he says that his real father is the town priest.

Anthony's big dream is to become a famous and wealthy actor and be as kind as Sikander—he doesn't know that Sikander is a murderer. Sikander never told him because he wanted Anthony to be a kind and nice gentleman, unlike himself. Anthony has big dreams, like living with high society peoples and meeting his idols.

One day when Anthony is practicing film dialogues with a couple of street gangsters, he meets Riya, a woman who has no family, is an orphan, who lives a middle-class lifestyle in Mumbai and works as an assistant director for a movie producer, Bharucha. Anthony introduces himself as the son of Jeffrey, who died in 1986, and works as a waiter in Jimmy's Pub, Bandra. She meets him again in the studios when he comes to audition for the part of Mark Anthony in a re-make of Shakespeare's Julius Caesar''. Both are attracted to each other and continue to meet. Little does Riya know that Anthony has lied to her, as he never had a father by the name of Jeffrey. When he gets the role of Mark Anthony, he goes to tell Sikander and he sees him murdering a person. Anthony now knows the true side of Sikander.

Anthony doesn't tell, but somehow how police inspector Khan finds out and goes to alert for Sikander, for which he needs the help of Anthony. He gets Anthony on his side, but Anthony is a man on his word and blames all the murders on Sikander's boss. To make it look real, Anthony does fake stunts, like blowing Murtaza's factory up and acting dead. In the climax, Anthony, Sikander, and the priest who raised Anthony, get together to kill Sikander's boss; that's when the police enter. Sikander gets arrested. Anthony marries Riya and becomes a big hero, a superstar, and his dreams come true.

Cast

Soundtrack 

The soundtrack of the film is composed by Pritam and Himesh Reshammiya while the lyrics are penned by Sameer.

Track list

References

External links
 My Name Is Anthony Gonsalves on Sahara One Motion Pictures 
 Official Website of Sahara One Motion Pictures 
 

2000s Hindi-language films
2008 films
Films scored by Himesh Reshammiya
Films featuring songs by Pritam
Films directed by Eeshwar Nivas
Indian crime drama films